Erwin Wilczek (20 November 1940 – 30 November 2021) was a Polish professional footballer who is most famous for his 1960s performances in both Górnik Zabrze and the Poland national team. He started as a forward, after some time he was moved to midfield.

Career
Wilczek was born in Wirek, a district of Ruda Śląska. He began his career with local team Wawel Wirek. In 1954 he moved to Zryw Chorzów and in 1959 to Górnik Zabrze, where he stayed until 1973. Wilczek played in 293 Ekstraklasa games as well as in 101 games of various competitions (Cup of Poland, European Cups). In the Polish League he scored 96 goals, together with Gornik he was nine times champion of Poland (1959, 1961, 1963–1967, 1971, 1972), won Cup of Poland six times (1965, 1968–1972), and in 1970 reached final game of UEFA Cup Winners' Cup.

Between 1961 and 1969 he was capped 16 times for the Poland national team, scoring two goals. In 1973 Wilczek moved to France, where he played for US Valenciennes, becoming the top scorer of the French Second Division.

After retiring he became scout, then B coach and finally manager of Valenciennes. In the 1980s he worked in Africa, among others for the team AS Sogara from Gabon.

References

1940 births
2021 deaths
People from the Province of Upper Silesia
Sportspeople from Ruda Śląska
Polish footballers
Association football forwards
Poland international footballers
Górnik Zabrze players
Valenciennes FC players
Ekstraklasa players
Ligue 1 players
Ligue 2 players
Polish football managers
Valenciennes FC managers
Polish expatriate footballers
Polish expatriate football managers
Polish expatriate sportspeople in France
Expatriate footballers in France
Expatriate football managers in France
Expatriate football managers in Gabon